Allan Glen Bateman (born 6 March 1965) is a Welsh former rugby union and rugby league footballer who played in the 1980s, 1990s and 2000s. He is a dual-code rugby international centre who represented the British and Irish Lions at rugby union, and Great Britain at rugby league.

Life and career
Born in Caerau near Maesteg in the north of the Llynfi Valley, Bateman was a precocious rugby talent playing for his Primary and Junior school team, Plasnewydd (coached by David Rogers), and the Maesteg Town team in the 1970s. He excelled at both rugby and soccer, being a very fast sprinter, and also possessing a very large lung capacity which allowed him to recover from physical exertion rapidly. He was an outstanding player for Maesteg Comprehensive School where he was coached by Peter Williams, brother of Wales and British Lions superstar J.J. Williams (also from the Llynfi Valley), and by Wales back row international Gareth Williams. He began his senior rugby career for Maesteg RFC "The Old Parish" at their Llynfi Road ground. As a centre for Neath, Bateman gained four caps for Wales in 1990 before moving to rugby league with Warrington Wolves.

Bateman played right- in Warrington's 12-2 victory over Bradford Northern in the 1990–91 Regal Trophy Final during the 1990–91 season at Headingley, Leeds on Saturday 12 January 1991, and played right- in the 10-40 defeat by Wigan in the 1994–95 Regal Trophy Final during the 1994–95 season at Alfred McAlpine Stadium, Huddersfield on Saturday 28 January 1995. He returned to rugby union after it went professional in 1996 to gain a further 31 Wales caps and one for the British and Irish Lions in 1997.  In rugby league he played for Wales 13 times and Great Britain twice. He also had a successful spell in Australian rugby league with the Cronulla Sharks. During his short stint at Northampton Saints he was a key figure in their Heineken Cup triumph in 2000. He became known as "The Clamp" in his rugby league days because of the ferocity of his tackling. He follows in a tradition of rugby talents from the Llynfi Valley including Chico Hopkins, J. J. Williams and Gwyn Evans.

Career Record in Rugby Union for Wales: Played 35:  Won 22, Lost 13 Test Points: 50 Tries: 10.

Following his retirement from professional rugby, Bateman continued to play for his hometown club of Maesteg.  Putting his education to good use, he now works in the Hematology Department of Princess of Wales Hospital but still plays at an amateur level for local club Heol-y-Cyw.

International honours
Allan Bateman won Rugby League caps for Wales while at Warrington, Cronulla, and Bridgend Blue Bulls 1991...2003 14-caps 5(6?)-tries 20(24?)-points.

References

External links
!Great Britain Statistics at englandrl.co.uk (statistics currently missing due to not having appeared for both Great Britain, and England)
Warrington’s World Cup heroes - Allan Bateman
Rugby legend Allan Bateman makes shock playing return 16 years after his Wales retirement… and proves class is permanent
The new life of Allan Bateman and the truth about being asked to throw a Wales match

1965 births
Living people
Bridgend Blue Bulls players
British & Irish Lions rugby union players from Wales
Cronulla-Sutherland Sharks players
Dual-code rugby internationals
Great Britain national rugby league team players
Maesteg RFC players
Neath RFC players
Northampton Saints players
Rugby league centres
Rugby league players from Maesteg
Rugby union players from Maesteg
Wales international rugby union players
Wales national rugby league team players
Warrington Wolves players
Welsh rugby league players
Welsh rugby union players
Richmond F.C. players